Goran Rađenović (born 4 November 1966 in Niš) is a former Serbian water polo player and now he is water polo coach. During his career he played in Partizan, Roma and Budva and won numerous national and international trophies. The most of his successes are from the time when he was part of national team of Yugoslavia. He played for national team 265 times and won Olympic, World and European Championship.

Early life
Goran Rađenović grew up in Blokovi, New Belgrade. He started swimming lessons with Goran Kasum (who also lived at the same place) when he was in the first grade.

Club career

VK Partizan
Rađenović started playing water polo at the age of 8 in water polo Club Partizan from Belgrade. He played in Partizan for 18 years and went through all age groups. In younger categories he won many titles.

He made his senior debut for Partizan in 1982 when he was 16 years old and he played in Partizan until 1992.

Titles won with Partizan:

National Championship of Yugoslavia (3): 1983/84, 1986/87,  1987/88;
National Cup of Yugoslavia  (7): 1981/82, 1984/85, 1986/87, 1987/88, 1989/90, 1990/91, 1991/92;
European Cup of Cups (1): 1989/90;
European Super Cup (1): 1990/91;
COMEN Cup (1): 1989.

Roma
In 1992 Rađenović transferred from Partizan to Water polo Club Roma from Rome and for that club he played for four years.

Titles won with Roma:

Three second places in The National Championship of Italy,
European Cup of Cups (1) 1995/96.
Len Euro Cup(1) 1993/94.

Budva
His last season (1996/97) as a player he spent in Water polo Club Budva but earlier during 1994. He spent few month in Budva and won National Championship of Yugoslavia.

National team
He went through all age groups of the national team of Yugoslavia and with the national team he won a great number of medals and titles. He made his debut for the national team in 1984 and in the following ten years he played 265 times for the team. This was the most successful period for water polo sport in Yugoslavia. Goran won two Olympic gold medals at two World Championships and for the first time, the European Championship was won by him as well. Rađenović was a member of a team that won Olympic gold in Seoul, World Championship gold medal in Perth and European Championship trophy in Athens.

Coaching career

Budva
After finishing his playing career in Water polo Club Budva in 1997 he became coach of a team in the same club. In season 1997/98 he won second place in the National Championship of Yugoslavia and in European Cup he made it to semifinals.

Bečej
The following two seasons he was coaching A team of Bečej Water polo Club. With Bečej he won two National Championships and two National Cups of Yugoslavia and one second place in European Champions Cup.

Anzio
He started coaching Anzio in season 2000/01 and in his first season he won first place in A2 Italian league. Following season he ended taking the team into Italian A1 Championship play off.

Camogli
From 2002 to 2006 he was coach of a team in Water polo Club Camogli and he was in charge of all younger teams of the club. During those four seasons his team was ranked from 5th to 8th place in National Championships of Italy as well as one semifinals in LEN Cup. Parallelly young categories win many first places in theirs championships.

Nervi
From 2006 to 2008 he worked as coach in Water polo Club Nervi from Genova. During two seasons in this club he was ranked 6 and 8 in A1 National Championship of Italy.

Pro Recco
From 2008 to 2014 he was in charge of younger categories of one of the biggest European clubs, Pro Recco from Recco and coordinator of water polo clubs from the region of Liguria. With this club he made huge success in championships of younger categories of Italy.

See also
 Yugoslavia men's Olympic water polo team records and statistics
 List of Olympic champions in men's water polo
 List of Olympic medalists in water polo (men)
 List of world champions in men's water polo
 List of World Aquatics Championships medalists in water polo

References

External links
 

1966 births
Living people
Sportspeople from Belgrade
Serbian male water polo players
Serbian water polo coaches
Yugoslav male water polo players
Olympic water polo players of Yugoslavia
Water polo players at the 1988 Summer Olympics
Olympic gold medalists for Yugoslavia
Olympic medalists in water polo
European champions for Yugoslavia
Medalists at the 1988 Summer Olympics
World Aquatics Championships medalists in water polo
Mediterranean Games silver medalists for Yugoslavia
Competitors at the 1991 Mediterranean Games
Mediterranean Games medalists in water polo
Universiade medalists in water polo
Universiade bronze medalists for Yugoslavia